Neoascia interrupta is a species of hoverfly in the family Syrphidae.

Distribution
France.

References

Eristalinae
Insects described in 1822
Diptera of Europe
Taxa named by Johann Wilhelm Meigen